Arash or Arash the Archer ( Āraš-e Kamāngīr) is a heroic archer-figure of Iranian mythology.

Arash is also a common Iranian first name. Variants include Aarash, Erash, Eruch,  or Erexsha). Notable persons with the name include:

Given name
Arts and entertainment
 Arash (composer) (born 1972), Arash Parsania, Iranian-German composer
 Arash (singer) (born 1977), real name Arash Labaf, Iranian-Swedish singer
 Arash Estilaf, known as Hua Bobo in China, Iranian actor and TV host active in China
 Arash Hejazi (born 1971), Iranian novelist
 Arash Howaida, Afghani singer, son of popular Afghan musician Zahir Howaida
 Arash Karimi (born 1977), Iranian photographer known for his documentary photos
 Arash "AJ" Maddah, Australian music promoter, founder of Soundwave and Harvest Music Festival
 Arash Pournouri (born 1981), Iranian-Swedish record manager, record producer, songwriter and record executive

Business and economy
 Arash Asli, Canadian businessman, founder of Yocale
 Arash Farboud, founder of Arash Motor Company
 Arash Ferdowsi (born 1985), co-founder of Dropbox
 Arash Vafadari, Iranian businessman 

Sports
 Arash Afshin (born 1990), Iranian footballer
 Arash Bayat (born 1983), Iranian-Swedish footballer
 Arash Borhani (born 1983), Iranian footballer
 Arash Dajliri (born 1999), Iranian footballer
 Arash Gholizadeh (born 1990), Iranian footballer
 Arash Kamalvand (born 1989), Iranian volleyball player 
 Arash Keshavarzi (born 1987), Iranian volleyball player
 Arash Markazi (born 1980), Iranian-American sports journalist
 Arash Miresmaeili (born 1981), Iranian Judo champion
 Arash Noamouz (born 1967), Iranian footballer 
 Arash Ostovari (born 1992), Iranian footballer
 Arash Rezavand (born 1993), Iranian footballer
 Arash Shahamati (born 1998), Iranian footballer
 Arash Soosarian (born 1986), Iranian footballer
 Arash Talebinejad (born 1981), Iranian-Swedish footballer
 Arash Usmanee (born 1982), Afghan-Canadian boxer

Others
 Arash Abizadeh, Iranian-Canadian philosopher and professor 
 Arash Sadeghi, Iranian political activist
 Arash Rahmanipour (1990-2010), one of the two people hanged in early 2010 by the Iranian government after being convicted of "waging war against God" (Moharebeh)
 Sayyid Arash Hosseini Milani, Iranian politician
 Seyed Arash Bagheri, Iranian English teacher

Surname
 Tawab Arash (born 1976), Afghan singer
 Ivan Bultinovich Kitanov aka Gavang Arash (1858–1926), Buddhist priest of Kalmykia

Persian masculine given names
Iranian masculine given names